The discography of the Kronos Quartet includes 43 studio albums, two compilations, five soundtracks, and 29 contributions to other artists' records. The Kronos Quartet plays classical, pop, rock, jazz, folk, world and contemporary classical music (often written especially for them by for instance Philip Glass, Terry Riley, Alexandra Vrebalov, ...) and was founded in 1973 by violinist David Harrington. Since 1978, they are based in San Francisco, California. Since 1985, the quartet's music has been released on Nonesuch Records.

Early recordings by the quartet contain contemporary classical music and adaptations of more popular music, such as jazz and rock and roll. Since the 1980s, and especially with the release of Cadenza on the Night Plain, written as a collaboration between composer Terry Riley and the quartet, much of the quartet's repertoire and album releases contain music written especially for them, by composers such as Terry Riley, Kevin Volans, Henryk Górecki, and Ástor Piazzolla. Their music "covers a who's who of 20th century-composers", as one critic noted in 1998.

Kronos has recorded five soundtracks including the 1998 score by Philip Glass for the scoreless (except for Tchaikovsky title music) 1931 sound movie Dracula, and has contributed to the soundtracks of five other movies, including Heat and 21 Grams. Outside the genre of classical music, Kronos has collaborated with a great number of other artists, especially pop artists, such as Joan Armatrading, Dave Matthews Band, Andy Summers, Nelly Furtado, and Nine Inch Nails.

The quartet has achieved considerable commercial and critical success and by 1998 (the year of the quartet's 25th anniversary) had sold more than 1.5 million albums. Many of Kronos' albums have ranked on various Billboard charts; the 1992 album Pieces of Africa reached #1 in the Top World Albums chart. The quartet won a Grammy for the 2003 album Lyric Suite.

Studio albums

Compilation albums

Video albums

Soundtracks

Contributions

References
General

 Catalog information from "Kronos Quartet" at Nonesuch Records (retrieved April 21, 2009) for Nonesuch releases and from Amazon.com for others, except where indicated.

Specific

Published music

Bibliography

Wynn, Ron. "Kronos Quartet", in

External links
 Kronos Quartet, on Nonesuch Records
 Kronos Quartet Website  and discography

Classical music discographies
Discographies of American artists